Francesco Serao (20 September 1702 - 5 August 1783) was an Italian physician, physicist, geologist, philosopher and scholar. He was born in San Cipriano d'Aversa and died in Naples, Italy.

Biography
Thanks to his maternal uncle, Don Antonio Forno, Serao was taught by the Jesuits in Naples. He followed the thinking of Descartes. At eighteen, he graduated in medicine and in 1727 he was awarded the chair of theoretical medicine. In 1732 he was professor of anatomy, then of medicine.

He was a member of the Royal Academy or Academy of Sciences of Naples with his teacher Niccolò Cirillo and was a member of the Academy of Sciences of Paris, of the London Academy, of the Benedictine University of Bologna and of other important scientific and literary groups in Europe. 

He translated John Pringle's medical works into Italian. Serao was chief physician of the Kingdom of Naples and physician to King Ferdinand IV of Bourbon. Serao died in 1783 and was buried in the church of Monteverginella in Naples.

Works
Vita Nicolai Cirilli, 1738
De suffocatis ad vitam revocandis, 1775
Consilia medica
Epistula ad Ioannonem Brunum sulla peste
De Castrensibus morbis
Istoria dell'incendio del Vesuvio accaduto nel mese di maggio 1737, Naples, published by Novello de Bonis, also translated into French and English in 1738
Lezioni accademiche sulla tarantola, 1742
Saggio di considerazioni anatomiche fatte su di un leone; Descrizione dell'elefante, Osservazioni sopra un fenomeno occorso nell'aprire un cinghiale, Naples, published by Giuseppe De Bonis,

See also
University of Naples Federico II

References

External links
Vesuvius Erupts, 1738, a summary of Serao's observations of Mount Vesuvius — Volcanoes, Basalt, and the Discovery of Geological Time An Exhibition of Rare Publications from the Collections of the Linda Hall Library 
Istoria dell'incendio del Vesuvio accaduto nel mese di maggio 1737 at archive.org

18th-century Italian physicians
18th-century Italian geologists
Academic staff of the University of Bologna
18th-century Italian physicists
18th-century Italian philosophers
1702 births
1783 deaths